Alexandre Charles Lanfant (1726–1792) was a French Jesuit.

1726 births
1792 deaths
French beatified people
French clergy killed in the French Revolution
18th-century French Jesuits